Ladislav Rygl Jr. (born May 15, 1976 in Vrchlabí) is a Czech nordic combined skier who competed from 1995 to 2006. Competing in three Winter Olympics, he had his best overall finish of eighth in the 4 x 5 km team event at Nagano in 1998 and his best individual finish of 17th in the 7.5 km sprint event at Turin in 2006.

Rygl's best finish at the FIS Nordic World Ski Championships was sixth in the 15 km individual event at Lahti in 2001. He earned three World Cup victories, one in a 7.5 km sprint and the others in the 15 km individual events in 1999 and 2000. In total he had 13 world cup podium finishes.

Rygl is the son of Ladislav Rygl Sr., winner of the Nordic combined event at the 1970 FIS Nordic World Ski Championships in Vysoké Tatry.

External links
Nordic combined team Olympic results: 1988-2002 

1976 births
Living people
People from Vrchlabí
Olympic Nordic combined skiers of the Czech Republic
Nordic combined skiers at the 1998 Winter Olympics
Nordic combined skiers at the 2002 Winter Olympics
Nordic combined skiers at the 2006 Winter Olympics
Czech male Nordic combined skiers
Sportspeople from the Hradec Králové Region